Vyyemkovo is a rural locality (a village) in Safronovskoye Rural Settlement of Lensky District, Arkhangelsk Oblast, Russia. The population was 1 as of 2010.

Geography 
Vyyemkovo is located on the Vychegda River, 10 km south of Yarensk (the district's administrative centre) by road. Lantysh is the nearest rural locality.

References 

Rural localities in Lensky District, Arkhangelsk Oblast